Nikolaus Gerbel (or Gerbellius) (c. 1485 – 1560) was a German humanist, jurist and doctor of both laws.

Nikolaus Gerbel was part of a circle of literary men living in Strasbourg. He is notable for his friendship with Martin Luther, his correspondence with Erasmus and Melanchthon and his support to Johann Reuchlin in the Pfefferkorn-Reuchlin Controversy.

He was born in Pforzheim in the Black Forest and studied at the University of Vienna (1502–1505), at the University of Cologne (1505–1506), at the University of Tübingen (1508–1512) and later at the University of Bologna. 
 
He published several works in ancient Greek geography (Descriptio Graeciae) and Roman history.

He also published the complete edition of Johannes Cuspinian's, to which he added a not always reliable Life of Cuspinian (Commentationes Cusp., Strasburg, 1540).

Gerbel's Nouum Testamentum graece was the first printed Greek text without parallel Latin translation. Gerbel used Erasmus's first bilingual edition (1516) as his source text.

References
Bietenholz, Peter G., and Thomas B. Deutscher. Contemporaries of Erasmus: A Biographical Register of the Renaissance and Reformation. University of Toronto Press, 2003. Entry on Nikolaus Gerbel, vol. 1, pp. 90–91.
 Auguste Frédéric Liebrich. Nicolas Gerbel, jurisconsulte-théologien du temps de la Réformation. Faculté de théologie protestante de Strasbourg. Strasbourg, 1857.

External links

World Digital Library presentation of Nicolai Gerbelij in descriptionem Graeciae Sophiani, praefatio, i.e. Preface by Nicolas Gerbelius to Nikolaos Sophianos’s Description of Greece.  Library of Congress.
 Nikolaos Sophianos, Gerbel's contemporary, was a noted Greek cartographer and scholar active in Italy.

1485 births
1560 deaths
People from Pforzheim
16th-century Latin-language writers
German Renaissance humanists
People from the Margraviate of Baden
German male writers
16th-century German jurists